Canoe is an unincorporated community located in Breathitt County, Kentucky, United States. Its post office closed in 1993.

The origin of the name Canoe is unclear. According to legend, at one point waters were so shallow on nearby Canoe Creek, a canoe had to be abandoned.

References

Unincorporated communities in Breathitt County, Kentucky
Unincorporated communities in Kentucky